The  refers to sending back to Japan the Japanese people who were left in Northeast China after the end of World War II in 1945. In this operation, done by the American forces' ships under the auspices of the Republic of China government, over one million Japanese were carried back to their homeland, from 1946 to 1948.

Post-war status of Japanese in Northeast China
By August 1945, almost 6.9 million Japanese were residing outside the current borders of Japan; 3,210,000 Japanese civilians and 3,670,000 military personnel, around 9% of Japan's population. 2 million were in Manchuria (formerly Manchukuo), and 1.5 million were in China proper.  Immediately after the Soviet invasion of Manchuria on 8 August 1945, 600,000 Japanese soldiers, and some civilians, were sent by the Soviet forces to Siberia for forced labor. Engineers and medical doctors were beginning to be asked for cooperation by the Chinese Communist forces.

Activities leading to the repatriation
The Japanese government did almost nothing for this population in the confusion after their defeat in the war. Three young men from Anshan (Kunio Maruyama, Hachiro Shimpo and Masamichi Musashi) volunteered to report the situation to Japan, and met with the Japanese government in Tokyo. They later met with General Douglas MacArthur, then the head of the Allied Occupation Forces, who immediately decided on the Japanese repatriation from Huludao.

Repatriation
The American forces who were assisting the Chinese Nationalist government were aware of this dangerous situation and sent ships on a tripartite operation to: 
 carry Chinese soldiers from Southern China to north in Huludao for reinforcement
 repatriate Japanese to Hakata Port, Fukuoka City, Japan
 transport to China the Chinese people who had worked in Japan mostly under forced labor

Huludao in Liaoning Province was the only strategic seaport and corridor to Northeast China that was held by the Nationalist forces, who were battling against the Chinese Communist forces for control of Northeast China.

From May 7, 1946 (when the operation began) till August 1948 (when it ended as Huludao was under pressure from the Communist forces), about 1,050,000 Japanese people were repatriated.  Many had died in Harbin, Changchun, Shenyang during the 1945-46 winter before this repatriation began. Those who reached Huludao in the worst conditions and died there were buried in the nearby Cishan mountain, in simple tombs facing east, toward their homeland.

Commemoration
A stele commemorating this event in the Sino-Japanese history stands on the seaport in Huludao. It cannot be easily visited because it is in a restricted area — Huludao is a strategic submarine base in China.

See also 
 Japanese settlers in Manchuria
 Japanese orphans in China
 Fushun War Criminals Management Center
 Retention of the Japanese in Tianshui, Gansu Province
 Japanese evacuation of Karafuto and the Kuril Islands

References

Books

History of Manchuria
Huludao
1940s in Japan
1940s in China
China in World War II
Japan in World War II
Japanese diaspora
China–Japan relations
Japanese people from Manchukuo